The 1903 Dickinson football team was an American football team that represented Dickinson College as an independent during the 1903 college football season. The team compiled a 7–5 record and outscored opponents by a total of 156 to 78. Charles P. Hutchins was the head coach.

Schedule

References

Dickinson
Dickinson Red Devils football seasons
Dickinson football